Charles Edoa Nga (born 17 May 1990) is a Cameroonian professional association footballer who plays as a striker for Royal Leopard in the Premier League of Eswatini.

Club career

Union Douala
Between 2008 and 2013 he played for Union Douala in his country.

Shillong Lajong
In June 2013, he joined the Indian I-League side Shillong Lajong FC. Though this stint lasted long only for two months.

Al-Orobah F.C.
In 10 August, he signed for Al-Orobah F.C.  in the Saudi Professional League.

Royal Leopards F.C.
Edoa scored the winning goal on his debut for Royal Leopards F.C. in February 2019.

International career
He made his senior debut for Cameroon against Tanzania, coming as a substitute.

References

External links
 

1990 births
Living people
Association football forwards
Al-Orobah FC players
Al-Tai FC players
Saudi First Division League players
Saudi Professional League players
Cameroonian footballers
Cameroon international footballers
Eding Sport FC players
Cameroonian expatriate sportspeople in Saudi Arabia
Expatriate footballers in Saudi Arabia